Abbasabad-e Ashrafi (also Romanized as ʿAbbāsābād-e Āshrafī; also known as ʿAbbāsābād) is a village in Qeblehi Rural District, in the Central District of Dezful County, Khuzestan Province, Iran. At the 2006 census, its population was 258, in 52 families.

References 

Populated places in Dezful County